A Taste for Death may refer to:
 A Taste for Death (P. D. James novel), a 1986 mystery novel by P. D. James
 A Taste for Death (Modesty Blaise), a 1969 Modesty Blaise adventure novel by Peter O'Donnell